Lim Ji-yeon (born June 23, 1990) is a South Korean actress. After appearing in a number of short films and plays, she had her first feature film role in Obsessed (2014). The role earned her a Grand Bell Award and a Baeksang Arts Award nomination, among other accolades. She subsequently starred in the film The Treacherous (2015) and the television series High Society (2015), winning an APAN Star Award and a Korea Drama Award for the latter. She gained further success in the television series Blow Breeze (2016–2017), Welcome 2 Life (2019), and The Glory (2022–2023), as well as the film Spiritwalker (2021).

Early life
Lim majored in Acting at Korea National University of Arts.

Career
In May 2020, Lim signed with new management agency Artist Company.

Filmography

Film

Television series

Web series

Television shows

Hosting

Awards and nominations

References

External links
 
 
 

21st-century South Korean actresses
South Korean film actresses
South Korean television actresses
South Korean stage actresses
Korea National University of Arts alumni
Living people
1990 births